Potosí (Aymara: Putusi) is a department in southwestern Bolivia. It comprises 118,218 km2 with 823,517  inhabitants (2012 census). The capital is the city of Potosí. 
It is mostly a barren, mountainous region with one large plateau to the west, where the largest salt flat in the world, Salar de Uyuni, is located.

Cerro Potosí was the richest province in the Spanish empire, providing a great percentage of the silver that was shipped to Europe.

Potosi is also the location of the San Cristóbal silver, zinc and lead mines, developed by the US-company Apex Silver Mines Limited of Colorado and in November 2008 sold to the Japanese Sumitomo Corporation.

Government
The chief executive office of Bolivia departments (since May 2010) is the governor; until then, the office was called the prefect, and until 2006 the prefect was appointed by the President of Bolivia. The current governor, Esteban Urquizu Cuéllar of the Movement for Socialism – Political Instrument for the Sovereignty of the Peoples was elected on 4 April 2010.

Legislative Assembly
Under the 2009 Constitution, each Bolivian department has an elected Departmental Legislative Assembly. The first elections were held 4 April 2010.

Demographics

Provinces of Potosi Department 

The department is divided into 16 provinces which are further subdivided into 40 municipalities (municipios) and 219 cantons (cantones).

Economy

Mining 
Pando mine (Gold)
Salar de Uyuni mine (Lithium)
San Vicente mine (Silver)

Languages 

The languages spoken in the department are mainly Quechua, Spanish  and Aymara. The following table shows the number of those belonging to the recognized group of speakers.

Places of interest 
 Eduardo Avaroa Andean Fauna National Reserve
 Torotoro National Park
 Laguna Colorada 
 Laguna Verde
 Laguna Blanca
 Salar de Uyuni
 Potosí
 Uyuni

Notable people
 Juana Azurduy de Padilla, guerrilla military leader.
 Manuel Ascencio Padilla, namesake of the town of Padilla, Bolivia.
 Modesto Omiste Tinajeros, writer, politician, and namesake of the province Modesto Omiste.

See also 
 Provinces of Bolivia

References

External links 

 Potosi Travel Guide
 Weather in Potosi
 Bolivian Music and Web Varieties
 Full information of Potosi Department

 
Departments of Bolivia

yi:בעני דעפארטמענט